Out is a 2002 Japanese film directed by Hideyuki Hirayama.

Cast
 Mieko Harada as Masako Katori
 Mitsuko Baisho as Yoshie Azuma
 Shigeru Muroi as Kuniko Jonouchi
 Naomi Nishida as Yayoi Yamamoto
 Teruyuki Kagawa as Akira Jumonji
 Kanpei Hazama as Mitsuyoshi Satake

References

External links

Films based on Japanese novels
Films directed by Hideyuki Hirayama
2000s Japanese-language films
2002 films
2000s Japanese films